Benedict Spence is an English cinematographer and director of photography. He has worked on a number of television series including Witless, In My Skin, GameFace and The End of the F***ing World.

Career
Spence began his career in factual entertainment, shooting programmes for the BBC, MTV and Sky. He has shot music videos for artists such as Beth Ditto and Leona Lewis, and TV commercials for clients such as Sony, Carphone Warehouse and Asda. His credits also include steadicam operating on The Inbetweeners Movie and camera supervisor on Sky Living's The Face with Naomi Campbell.

Spence was cinematographer on The Blue Door, nominated by BAFTA for the Best British Short in 2019, and has worked on all five episodes of the BATFA award-winning In My Skin.

Selected filmography
Mister Winner (TV Series) (6 episodes)
 - The Stag Do (2020)
 - The Package (2020)
 - The Interview (2020)
 - The Decorating Job (2020)
 - The Piano (2020)
 - Episode #1.6

In My Skin (TV series) (5 episodes)
 - 5 (2020)
 - 4 (2020)
 - 3 (2020)
 - 2 (2020)
 - Pilot (2020)

The End of the F***ing World (TV series) (4 episodes)

 - Episode #2.2 (2019)
 - Episode #2.1 (2019)
 - Episode #2.4 (2019)
 - Episode #2.3 (2019)

Witness (TV series) (11 episodes, 2016 - 2018) (director of photography - 4 episodes, 2016)

 - Episode #3.5 (2018)
 - Episode #3.4 (2018)
 - Episode #3.3 (2018)
 - Episode #3.2 (2018)
 - Episode #3.1 (2018)
 - Episode #2.5 (2017)
 - Episode #2.4 (2017)
 - Episode #2.3 (2017)
 - Episode #2.2 (2017)
 - Episode #2.1 (2017)
 - Episode #1.5 (2016)
 - Episode #1.4 (2016)
 - Episode #1.3 (2016)
 - Episode #1.2 (2016)
 - Episode #1.1 (2016)

The Blue Door (Short)

GameFace (TV series) (6 episodes)
 - Conch (2017)
 - Skint (2017)
 - Spider (2017)
 - Onion (2017)
 - Wild (2017)
 - Hero, Warrior, Fireman, Liar (2017)

The Face (TV series) (director of photography as Ben Spence - 16 episodes)

 - Week Eight (2013)
 - The Final (2013)
 - Week Seven (2013)
 - The Semi-Final (2013)
 - Week Six (2013)
 - Meet the Press (2013)
 - Week Five (2013)
 - The AD Campaign (2013)
 - Week Four (2013)
 - The Lingerie Shoot (2013)
 - Week Three (2013)
 - The Catwalk Show (2013)
 - Week Two (2013)
 - The Magazine Shoot (2013)
 - Week One (2013)
 - The Casting Call (2013)

References

Living people
English cinematographers
Year of birth missing (living people)